"Like Herod" is a song by Scottish post-rock band Mogwai from their 1997 debut studio album, Mogwai Young Team, written by Stuart Braithwaite, Dominic Aitchison, John Cummings and Martin Bulloch. As well as being a fan-favourite, the song is a live staple, and an extreme display of Mogwai's quiet/loud dynamic contrast method. An 18-minute-long version of "Like Herod" (recorded live by Steve Lamacq from a BBC Radio Session at the BBC Recording and Broadcast Studio in Maida Vale in March 1999) appears on Mogwai's live compilation album, Government Commissions: BBC Sessions 1996-2003. The song was originally titled "Slint", referring to the influential American post-rock band Slint. Stuart Braithwaite has said that "Like Herod" is his favourite song from Mogwai Young Team.

Musical composition
"Like Herod" is an 11-minute 39 second long instrumental in the key of E minor. The song begins with a bassline similar to that of the Manic Street Preachers' song "Ifwhiteamericatoldthetruthforonedayit'sworldwouldfallapart":
 
This is joined at (0:04) by a guitar, doubling the bassline, and at (0:16) by quiet drumming, and an additional guitar counter-melody. At (0:46), the song progresses into an alternate melody, based around the chord of C major seventh, which is repeated, then the song goes back to repeating the main melody until (1:30), where the alternate melody is repeated once more. The drums then begin to get quieter and quieter, coming to a halt at (2:15), leaving only the guitars and the bass to play the main and alternate melodies themselves, which they do until (2:57), when all the instruments explode in a barrage of deafening noise, featuring a heavy drumbeat and highly distorted, screeching guitars. This continues until (4:51), where the original bassline is introduced once more, and the original drumbeat begins playing. At (5:17), the drumbeat stops abruptly and all that is heard is the bassline, and a guitar, plucking a muted note. This continues, with the plucked note becoming gradually more erratic, until (6:15), when all of the instruments explode into another torrent of noise, almost identical to the last one, albeit with more guitar feedback in the background. This continues until (8:08), when the drumbeat becomes calmer, the guitar feedback becomes more subdued, and the bass can be heard quietly in the background, repeating a heavily distorted note at the start of each bar. At (10:11), the drumbeat ends and all that can be heard is the steady pulse of the ride cymbal, the distorted bass note, and a guitar feedbacking, until (10:20), when it seems to go gradually upwards in pitch, ending at (10:29). Snippets of feedback are heard momentarily as the bass note continues to be played, until (11:05), when the bass note plays one last time, and begins feedbacking, along with subdued guitar noise in the background, until (11:35), when all the instruments cease playing and the song ends.

Critical reception
During professional reviews, "Like Herod" received mostly good reception. The song is an album track pick at Allmusic. Brandon Wu of Ground and Sky notes the "raw power in [the] piece, but unlike the best Mogwai pieces it lacks any sort of melody or beauty." However, Ian Mathers of Stylus Magazine dismisses the song as "good-but-redundant."

Trivia

 The song was also featured in the intro-sequence in the PlayStation version of Actua Ice Hockey 2.

Personnel
 Stuart Braithwaite – guitar
 Dominic Aitchison – bass guitar
 John Cummings – guitar
 Martin Bulloch – drums
 Paul Savage – producer, mixer

Notes

External links
"Like Herod" on Last.fm
"Like Herod" Guitar Tablature

Mogwai songs
1997 songs
Rock instrumentals
Songs written by Stuart Braithwaite
Songs written by Dominic Aitchison